Neptune, also called Poseidon, is a fictional character appearing in American comic books published by Marvel Comics. The character is based on the Roman God with the same name and his Greek counterpart. Neptune is the god of the sea in the Olympian pantheon, and the patron god of Atlantis. Neptune first appeared in Tales to Astonish #70 and was adapted by Stan Lee and Gene Colan.

Fictional character biography
Neptune is the son of Cronus and Rhea, and was born in Mount Olympus. Zeus and Pluto are his brothers, and Hera and Vesta are his sisters. Neptune is responsible for the evolution of Homo mermanus, and is still honored by the Atlanteans, unlike many Olympians who have little or no worshippers on Earth.

Two millennia ago, Neptune destroyed an Atlantean cult of worshipers of Set. He later lived among the Atlanteans for many years as their protector.

In modern times, Neptune sent Namor the Sub-Mariner on a quest for his trident in order to regain the Atlantean throne, appearing before him at various points. Neptune then appeared to the Atlanteans, and decreed Namor the true ruler of Atlantis. Neptune later advised Namor of the true destiny of Atlantis. Later, Neptune healed a wounded Namor, and transformed a drowning stallion into a giant seahorse.

Neptune later abducted Namor from Atlantis to Hades at the behest of Zeus, as Zeus blamed the Avengers for Hercules' bad physical condition. However, Neptune was then forbidden to return to Earth by Zeus, despite his objections due to Atlantean worship.

Most recently, he, along with the other Olympians have dwelt on Earth once more following the death of Zeus. In a weakened state, he was abducted by Hippolyta and her Amazon warriors, at the behest of Hera and Pluto, who forced him to cede his shares of the Olympus Group to them, facilitating their takeover. The Amazon princess Artume likewise forced from him the location of the Omphalos. He was rescued from Artume's clutches by Hercules, Namor, and Namora.

Neptune was present when Athena led the Olympus Group at Hercules' funeral. He then sided with Athena when the other Olympian Gods challenged her for leadership over the Olympian Gods at the time when Amadeus Cho was made leader of the Olympus Group. Neptune chose Namor as his proxy. The battle between the mortal proxies ended in a draw and the Olympian Gods stopped fighting each other and fought the other Gods.

As Hulk scales Mount Olympus to ask Zeus for help, Neptune is among the Olympian Gods that tried to stop him. Neptune sent a tidal wave at Hulk on the side of Mount Olympus which he withstood. This annoyed Hulk when Neptune called him a hero as he continued to climb Mount Olympus.

Powers, abilities, and equipment
Neptune possesses the typical powers of an Olympian, including immense strength, stamina, durability, speed, and healing, as well as virtual immortality. Poseidon has the ability to wield vast cosmic/mystical energies for numerous purposes, such as inter-dimensional teleportation. As a sea god, Neptune is able to manipulate water at will, breathe oxygen/underwater, and communicate with all forms of sea life. He usually arms himself with a 6' 5" long enchanted trident, capable of divine magic.

Reception
 In 2019, CBR.com ranked Poseideon 3rd in their "Marvel Comics: The 10 Most Powerful Olympians" list.
 In 2021, CBR.com ranked Poseidon 3rd in their "Marvel: 10 Most Powerful Olympians" list.
 In 2022, Screen Rant included Neptune in their "10 Most Powerful Olympian Gods In Marvel Comics" list.

In other media
Neptune appears in the "Namor" segment of The Marvel Super Heroes.

References

External links
 
 Poseidon at Marvel.com

Classical mythology in Marvel Comics
Fictional characters with dimensional travel abilities
Fictional characters with energy-manipulation abilities
Fictional characters with immortality
Fictional characters with superhuman durability or invulnerability
Fictional characters with water abilities
Fictional gods
Greek and Roman deities in fiction
Marvel Comics characters who can move at superhuman speeds
Marvel Comics characters who can teleport
Marvel Comics characters who use magic
Marvel Comics characters with accelerated healing
Marvel Comics characters with superhuman strength
Poseidon